"Auntie Diaries" is a song by American rapper Kendrick Lamar, from his fifth studio album Mr. Morale & the Big Steppers (2022). The fifteenth track on Mr. Morale & the Big Steppers and the sixth track on the album's second half, "Auntie Diaries" was produced by an ensemble of producers, including Beach Noise, Bekon & The Donuts, Craig Balmoris, Daniel Tannenbaum, and Tyler Mehlenbacher.

"Auntie Diaries" covers themes of transphobia. In the song, Lamar directly addresses his perspective on the gender transition of his uncle and cousin. Although lauded by many transgender activists and personalities, Lamar's use of the slur faggot and direct approach towards the subject received critique and incited controversy.

Lamar at the end of the song leaves listeners with a question to ponder about his use of the slur by telling the story of a previous performance in which he brought out a white female fan to perform his song with him but disapproved of her usage of the N-word, speaking in third person and critiquing himself as a hypocrite for that. This song, like many of his others, seems to be more concerned about provoking thought in listeners more than avoiding controversy.

In the United States, "Auntie Diaries" reached number 47 on the Billboard Hot 100 and number 21 on the Hot R&B/Hip-Hop Songs chart.

Background 
On April 18, 2022, Kendrick Lamar announced a new album, titled Mr. Morale & The Big Steppers, his fifth studio album following the release of Damn (2017). The announcement was made through his website, oklama.com, launched in August 2021.

Composition and lyrics 

Musically, "Auntie Diaries" is sonically apathetic. Narration from German spiritual teacher Eckhart Tolle is sampled at the beginning of the song, followed by Lamar's verses.

The song is a reflection upon Lamar's acceptance of gender transitions within his family; the first verse of the song begins, "My auntie is a man now". Lamar's uncle and cousin are both transgender. "Auntie Diaries" continues the confessional motif of Mr. Morale & the Big Steppers. In the song, Lamar repeatedly uses the word faggot, a slur for gay men, misgenders his family's pronouns, and deadnames his family and Olympic gold medalist Caitlyn Jenner. Lamar justifies his use of the slur in the song by stating that he "ain't know no better", while chastising those who are aware. The song culminates in Lamar confronting a minister, questioning the loving thy neighbor in regards to Christianity and homosexuality, stating, "The laws of the land or the heart, what's greater?"

Credits and personnel
Personnel

 Kendrick Lamar songwriter, production
 Daniel Tannenbaum production
 Homer Steinweiss production
 Craig Balmoris production
 Daniel Krieger production
 Beach Noise production
 Jake Kosich production
 Johnny Kosich production, engineer
 Matt Schaeffer production, engineer
 Sergiu Gherman production
 Tyler Mehlenbacher production

Information taken from the Mr. Morale & the Big Steppers liner notes and Tidal.

Charts

References 

2022 songs
Kendrick Lamar songs
Songs written by Kendrick Lamar
Transgender-related songs
LGBT-related songs